Mary or May Ruth Manning (1853 – 27 January 1930) was an Irish landscape painter and teacher.

Life
Mary Ruth (May) Manning was born in Dublin in 1853, the daughter of engineer Robert Manning and Susanna (née Gibson). Apart from a period of time living in Hampstead, London from 1889 to 1892, Manning lived in the family home at Ely Place from 1880. One of her sisters, Georgina Manning (aka Geraldine) was a suffragette who vandalised a bust of John Redmond at a Royal Hibernian Academy exhibition in 1913.

Neither Manning nor her sisters married, living in Ely Place until after their father's death, and then on Winton Road, Lesson Park. She died there on 27 January 1930.

Artistic work and influence
Manning studied in Paris in the 1870s with Louise Catherine Breslau and Sarah Purser. She worked primarily in oil and watercolour. From 1880 to 1892, her work was exhibited by the Royal Birmingham Society of Artists, the Walker Art Gallery, the Royal Hibernian Academy (RHA), and in Brussels. Manning is best known for her influence on a number of Irish women artists of the time. She and sisters held art lessons from a studio for young women who could to enter the RHA, many of whom she encouraged to study in Paris. Amongst the artists she taught and influenced are Mary Swanzy and Mainie Jellett. Her teaching took up most of her time, which led to her exhibiting her own work infrequently. Manning became a member of the Dublin Sketching Club in 1885.

An oil painting of a landscape and setting sun by Manning is on display in the National Gallery of Ireland, whilst her Study of a boy is in the collections of the Hugh Lane Gallery.

References

1853 births
1930 deaths
20th-century Irish painters
20th-century Irish women artists
19th-century Irish painters
19th-century Irish women artists
Artists from Dublin (city)
Irish women painters